Richard Adams (1920–2016) was an English novelist, author of Watership Down and The Plague Dogs.

Richard Adams may also refer to:

Richard Adams (activist) (1947–2012), Filipino-American gay rights activist
Richard Adams (architect) (1791–1835), Scottish painter and architect
Richard Adams (British politician) (1912–1978), British politician
Richard Adams (cricketer) (1838–1897), English cricketer
Richard Adams (inventor) (born 1954), inventor of various electronic devices
Richard Adams (poet) (1619–1661), collector of verse
Richard Adams (religious writer) (c. 1626–1698), English minister and writer
Richard Adams (businessman) (born 1946), British fair-trade organisation founder
Richard Adams (U.S. politician) (born 1939), member of the Ohio House of Representatives
Richard Adams (violinist) (born 1957), New Zealand jazz violinist and artist
Richard C. Adams (1864–1921), Lenape poet and writer
Richard D. Adams (1909–1987), United States Navy admiral
Richard Life Adams (1840–1883), British architect; see Adams & Kelly
Richard Newbold Adams (1924–2018), American anthropologist

See also
 Dick Adams (disambiguation)
 Rick Adams (disambiguation)
 Richard (disambiguation)
 Adams (disambiguation)
 Richard Adam, born 1957, an English businessman